Kansky District is an administrative and municipal district (raion), one of the forty-three in Krasnoyarsk Krai, Russia. It is located in the southeast of the krai and borders with Dzerzhinsky District in the north, Abansky District in the northeast, Ilansky District in the east, Irbeysky District in the south, Rybinsky District in the southwest, and with Sukhobuzimsky District in the west. Its administrative center is the town of Kansk (which is not administratively a part of the district). Population:  28,667 (2002 Census);

Geography
The district is situated in the Kan River valley. The tributaries of the Kan flow through the district.

History
The district was founded on April 4, 1924.

Administrative and municipal status
Within the framework of administrative divisions, Kansky District is one of the forty-three in the krai. The town of Kansk serves as its administrative center, despite being incorporated separately as a krai town—an administrative unit with the status equal to that of the districts. The district is divided into fifteen selsoviets.

As a municipal division, the district is incorporated as Kansky Municipal District and is divided into fifteen rural settlements (corresponding to the administrative district's selsoviets). The krai town of Kansk is incorporated separately from the district as Kansk Urban Okrug.

Economy
A part of the Kansk-Achinsk lignite basin, which in the early 1980s was developed into one of the largest coal areas of the Soviet Union, lies within the district's boundaries.

Transportation
The Trans-Siberian Railway runs through district territory from west to east. A part of the federal highway M53 passes through the district as well.

Notable people
Pyotr Slovtsov, opera tenor

References

Notes

Sources

External links
Kanskiye vedomosti, website of the local newspaper
Glinka State Central Museum of Musical Culture. List of Pyotr Slovtsov's discs.
"Pyotr Ivanovich Slovtsov: Russian Tenor"

Districts of Krasnoyarsk Krai
States and territories established in 1924